Neptis matilei is a butterfly in the family Nymphalidae. It is found in Gabon and Cameroon.

References

Butterflies described in 2000
matilei